Indiana Government Center North is a high rise in Indianapolis, Indiana. It was completed in 1960 and has 14 floors. It is primarily used for office spaces for the government of Indiana. Extensive remodeling and renovation of the building made in conjunction with the construction of the adjacent Indiana Government Center South building was completed in 1993.

See also
List of tallest buildings in Indianapolis

External links

Indiana Government Center North at Skyscraper Page
Indiana Government Center North at Emporis

Skyscraper office buildings in Indianapolis
State government buildings in the United States
Government buildings completed in 1960
Government of Indiana
Government buildings in Indiana
1960 establishments in Indiana